Emma Farrell may refer to:
Emma Forsayth (1850–1913), business woman and plantation owner, also known as Emma Farrell
Emma Farrell (freediver) (born 1973), freediver and author